Gilbert Privat (27 May 1892 – 3 August 1969) was a French sculptor. His work was part of the sculpture event in the art competition at the 1928 Summer Olympics.

References

1892 births
1969 deaths
20th-century French sculptors
French male sculptors
Olympic competitors in art competitions
Sculptors from Toulouse